Styrax obassia is a species of flowering plant in the family Styracaceae. It is native to Hokkaido Island in Japan, and to China.

Taxonomy
The name of the plant is sometimes spelled Styrax obassis, but the original spelling is obassia. In the history of botany, different people have used all three grammatical genders for the genus Styrax, and reasonable arguments could be made for treating it as neuter, feminine, or masculine, although it has been recommended that masculine gender should be used.

Cultivation
Styrax obassis is cultivated as an ornamental plant in gardens.

References

E. Kato and T. Hiura, Fruit set in Styrax obassia (Styracaceae): the effect of light availability, display size, and local floral density, American Journal of Botany. 1999;86:495-501.

External links

 
 

obassis
Flora of Japan
Flora of China
Garden plants of Asia